Miguel Ángel Montes Moreno (born 12 February 1980 in Sensuntepeque) is a Salvadoran former footballer. He was banned for life in 2013, for match fixing while playing for the El Salvador national football team.

Club career
On 13 November 2009, Montes was linked with a move to the Primera División de Fútbol de El Salvador (La Primera) club Indios de Ciudad Juárez. He did not sign with the club, as Indios coach José Treviño stated that reinforcements, including Montes, would not be brought in. On 15 April 2011, Miguel Montes left C.D. Águila after 2 years in the club, first being capped in the La Primera's Apertura 2009. He left because the club had not paid him for over a month and a half. On 14 May 2011, Miguel Montes signed for one year at Isidro Metapán. He told a Salvadoran radio station, "I'm happy because I reached an agreement with the people of Isidro Metapán, they were interested like me and came to the concentration, spoke with me and we reached an agreement." In May 2012, he signed for Alianza.

International career
Montes received call ups to the national team in 1998 and in 2001, but did not get his first cap until 24 May 2004, in a friendly match against Haiti. Following the Haiti game, Montes was once again neglected by national team coaches, that is until June 2007 when Mexican coach Carlos de los Cobos called him up to participate in the 2007 CONCACAF Gold Cup. Although he missed out on the opening two game, Montes did play in the team's third and final cup game against the USA. Since then, Montes has become a mainstay with the national team.

On 20 March 2010, Montes was given a one-year ban and a fine of $250 by the El Salvador Football Federation on account of not wearing the team's sponsored kit. He wore gloves and socks for a different sponsor on numerous occasions, including the Gold Cup in the U.S in 2009.
The federation signed a $600,000 deal with the sponsor in 2008, meaning all players were to wear the same sponsored kit to fulfill the sponsorship deal. 

After a year of suspension, Montes was called up by then coach José Luis Rugamas in a friendly international against Cuba on 24 March 2011. He entered as substitute for injured Dagoberto Portillo in the second half.

On September 20, 2013, Montes was one of 14 Salvadoran players banned for life due to their involvement with match fixing.

References

External links
 

 El Grafico Profile 

1980 births
Living people
People from Sensuntepeque
Association football goalkeepers
Salvadoran footballers
El Salvador international footballers
2001 UNCAF Nations Cup players
2007 CONCACAF Gold Cup players
2009 UNCAF Nations Cup players
2009 CONCACAF Gold Cup players
2011 CONCACAF Gold Cup players
Alianza F.C. footballers
C.D. Luis Ángel Firpo footballers
C.D. Chalatenango footballers
Nejapa footballers
C.D. Águila footballers
A.D. Isidro Metapán footballers
Sportspeople involved in betting scandals
Sportspeople banned for life